The Uno Peak Fire was a wildfire on the slopes of Lake Chelan, approximately 15 miles from Manson, Washington in the United States. The human caused fire was started on August 30, 2017.

Incidents

August

The Uno Peak Fire was on August 30, 2017 on the steep, eastern shore slopes of Lake Chelan, approximately 15 miles from Manson, Washington. At the time, the cause of the fire remained unknown. Firefighters immediately began fighting the fire with assistance from one airtanker and three helicopters that provided water delivery. Areas around the fire were closed, specifically the Summer Blossom and Safety Harbor Trailheads and the South Navarre Campground. The fire was burning on fuels comprising timber, grass and rugged terrain.

September

Dozers were called in to construct fire lines and crews began preparing forest roads for new fire growth. Two more campgrounds were closed. On September 2, a second fire, the Ferry Peak Fire, was reported a mere two miles northwest of the Uno Peak Fire. Road closures and additional trails were closed. A voluntary evacuation was put in place for two residences on Lake Chelan. Two properties in the area remained threatened and crews worked on protecting the threatened areas. The historic Crow Cabin was destroyed. 

The Washington Air National Guard began lending air support to the fire with two Sikorsky UH-60 Black Hawks. The Silver State Hotshots from Nevada arrived on September 13 to help fight the fire. The next day, the fire spread the Big Goat Mountain and the Lone Fir Creek.

October

Effects/Impact

The Uno Peak Fire burned in prior burn areas from the Rex Fire (2001) and the Safety Harbor Fire (1971). In October, Central Washington Burned Area Emergency Response (BAER) assessed the burn area and requested $84,470 in funding to help with threats to human life, safety, property, and critical natural or cultural resources in the wake of the fire. BAER reported specific concerns regarding increased risk of flooding and debris laden flows at Safety Harbor and Lone Fir Creek which could impact tourist activities and threatens structures in the area.

References

2017 Washington (state) wildfires
August 2017 events in the United States
Chelan County, Washington
September 2017 events in the United States